Mesosa pardina is a species of beetle in the family Cerambycidae. It was described by Heller in 1926. It is known from the Philippines.

References

pardina
Beetles described in 1926